Caterina de' Medici (2 May 159317 April 1629) was Duchess of Mantua and Montferrat as the second wife of Duke Ferdinando and Governor of Siena from 1627. She was the second daughter of Grand Duke Ferdinando I of Tuscany and his wife Christina of Lorraine.

Biography

The second daughter and third child of Grand Duke Ferdinando I and Christina of Lorraine, Caterina, named after the eponymous Queen of France, was born in Florence on 2 May 1593. 

Caterina was considered as a potential spouse to Henry Frederick, Prince of Wales, heir to the three Kingdoms of England, Scotland and Ireland, but his Anglican religion presented an insurmountable barrier. 

Eventually, she married in 1617 Ferdinando Gonzaga, Duke of Mantua and Montferrat; the marriage, however, was childless. 

Upon being made a widow in 1626, she returned to Tuscany. Her nephew, Grand Duke Ferdinando II, created her Governess of Siena in 1627, where she died of smallpox two years later. 

In later life, Caterina garnered a reputation for intense piety.  Historian Colonel G.F. Young asserts that she bore a striking resemblance to her brother Cosimo II and sister Claudia. She was interred in the Medicean necropolis, the Basilica of San Lorenzo.

Ancestors

References

Sources

Young, G.F.: The Medici: Volume II, John Murray, London, 1920

|-

|-

|-

Catherine
Duchesses of Mantua
Duchesses of Montferrat
Tuscan princesses
Nobility from Florence
1593 births
1629 deaths
Governors of Siena
Deaths from smallpox
Burials at San Lorenzo, Florence
17th-century women rulers
Daughters of monarchs